Molly Ephraim (born May 22, 1986) is an American actress who has appeared in films, television, and Broadway, Off-Broadway, and regional theater productions. She is best known for her role as Mandy Baxter on the ABC sitcom Last Man Standing during its original run (2011–2017). Ephraim has also appeared on a number of other TV series, including Brockmire (2017), Halt and Catch Fire (2017), and Casual (2018).  Ephraim portrayed Irene Kelly in the Hugh Jackman movie The Front Runner (2018), her second collaboration with her Last Man Standing co-star Kaitlyn Dever. She also appeared on HBO's Perry Mason as Della Street’s lover Hazel Prystock. She plays Maybelle Fox on the Amazon series A League of Their Own.

Early life
Ephraim was born in Philadelphia, Pennsylvania, and was raised Jewish. She grew up in Bucks County, Pennsylvania. Ephraim performed in shows at the Bucks County Playhouse, and in professional productions at the Prince Music Theater and at the Arden Theatre Company in Philadelphia.

In 2008, Ephraim graduated from Princeton University with a B.A. in Religious Studies,  after going to Central Bucks East High School. At Princeton she was a member of the Triangle Club and performed in and choreographed various shows for Princeton University Players and Theatre Intime.

Career

Theater
Ephraim made her Broadway debut as Little Red Riding Hood in the Broadway revival of Into the Woods in 2002, receiving a Drama League Award nomination. She later played Bielke in a Broadway revival of Fiddler on the Roof (2004). Off-Broadway, Ephraim played Rachel Stein in End Days at the Ensemble Studio Theatre in 2009. She played Olive in The 25th Annual Putnam County Spelling Bee at the Barrington Stage Company in 2008, in a remounting of the production with new direction by Jeremy Dobrish, and at the North Shore Music Theatre. In 2010, she played Anne Frank in The Diary of Anne Frank at the Westport Country Playhouse.

In 2015, Ephraim appeared as "Daphna Feygenbaum" in Joshua Harmon's Bad Jews at the Geffen Playhouse in Los Angeles.

Film and television
Ephraim appeared as a series regular in the role of Mandy Baxter, daughter of series' lead Mike Baxter (portrayed by Tim Allen), on the ABC sitcom Last Man Standing, which premiered on October 11, 2011 and originally ended in March 2017, canceled after six seasons. The series was revived by Fox in May 2018, but Ephraim opted not to return for the show's seventh season, with Molly McCook recast in the role.

Ephraim has appeared on several other television series, including Royal Pains (2009), Law & Order (2008), the Michael J. Fox-produced pilot Hench at Home (2003), the HBO pilot The Wonderful Maladys (2009), and has had recurring roles on Brockmire (2017), Halt and Catch Fire (2017), Casual (2018) and Perry Mason (2020).

Ephraim portrayed Wendy Greenhut in the film College Road Trip (2008) and Ali Rey in the film Paranormal Activity 2 (2010) and the spin-off film Paranormal Activity: The Marked Ones (2014). Ephraim appeared in a supporting role in the 2018 biographical political drama The Front Runner, portraying Irene Kelly. She also played Gypsy Rose Blanchard's attorney in The Act on Hulu.

As of August 12, 2022, Ephraim plays Maybelle Fox on the Amazon series A League of Their Own.

Personal life

Ephraim was married in September 2021. Her husband, Evan, works at a software company. On December 1, 2021, Ephraim gave birth to the couple's first child, daughter Zia.

Filmography

Film

Television

References

External links

Living people
21st-century American actresses
Actresses from Philadelphia
American child actresses
American film actresses
American musical theatre actresses
American stage actresses
American television actresses
People from Bucks County, Pennsylvania
Princeton University alumni
Jewish American actresses
21st-century American Jews
1986 births